The Eastern Economic Journal is a quarterly peer-reviewed academic journal covering all aspects of economics. It was established in 1973 and is published by Palgrave Macmillan on behalf of the Eastern Economic Association. The editors-in-chief are Susan L. Averett and Edward N. Gamber (Lafayette College).

Abstracting and indexing 
The journal is abstracted and indexed in:

External links 
 
 Eastern Economic Association

Economics journals
English-language journals
Publications established in 1973
Quarterly journals
Palgrave Macmillan academic journals
Academic journals associated with learned and professional societies